Kåre Erling Gjønnes (30 January 1942 – 26 July 2021) was a Norwegian politician for the Christian Democratic Party. He had been County Governor of Sør-Trøndelag from 1993, but went on leave from 1997 till 2000 to serve as Minister of Agriculture. He was also Minister of Nordic Cooperation in 2000.

References

1942 births
2021 deaths
People from Orkdal
Ministers of Agriculture and Food of Norway
Members of the Storting
Christian Democratic Party (Norway) politicians
20th-century Norwegian politicians